Super Mole Escape is an iOS endless runner
action video game. it was developed by Grumpyface Studios and published by Adult Swim Games and released on August 9, 2012.

Critical reception

The game received "favorable" reviews according to the review aggregation website Metacritic.

AppAdvice said, "With Super Mole Escape, think of Jetpack Joyride, except it is vertical rather than horizontal. This alone makes the game feel refreshing and new, already worthy of being in your collection." Modojo wrote, "You won't play a more experimental, risky, fun and flamboyant endless-runner this year, and for that reason alone we're happy to recommend this as the best example of genre evolution we've seen in a very long time indeed. Bravo." Pocket Gamer said, "Blessed with instantly appealing gameplay, engaging presentation, and plenty of long-term challenge, Super Mole Escape is a must-have download." Gamezebo said, "Its tilt controls are some of the best I've seen in an endless runner (there are also touch controls, but I found myself preferring tilt), the graphics are as vibrant and charming as we've grown to expect from an [adult swim]-published game, and the inclusion of achievements and sundry unlockables makes the game dangerously addictive." TouchArcade said, "Super Mole Escape knows what it does well, and exploits it to its fullest." AppSpy said it was "Not an endless runner, but an endless tunneler, that has visual appeal plus addictive gameplay coupled with fair prices for upgrades." Edge wrote, "The thrill of the chase is still present [...] even if we've come to expect something a little more subversive from Adult Swim."

References

2012 video games
Adult Swim games
Endless runner games
IOS games
IOS-only games
Platform games
Video games developed in the United States
Grumpyface Studios games